Héctor Osvaldo Arrigo (born 24 January 1986) was an Argentine footballer. His last club was Mexican team Potros UAEM.

References
 
 
 

1986 births
Living people
Argentine footballers
Argentine expatriate footballers
Primera Nacional players
Torneo Argentino A players
Torneo Federal A players
Primera B de Chile players
Categoría Primera A players
Club Atlético Belgrano footballers
Sportivo Desamparados footballers
Juventud Antoniana footballers
Racing de Córdoba footballers
Deportivo Merlo footballers
Villa Dálmine footballers
Coquimbo Unido footballers
Club Atlético Zacatepec players
Jaguares de Córdoba footballers
Expatriate footballers in Chile
Expatriate footballers in Mexico
Expatriate footballers in Colombia
Argentine expatriate sportspeople in Chile
Argentine expatriate sportspeople in Mexico
Association football forwards
Argentine expatriate sportspeople in Colombia
Footballers from Córdoba, Argentina